Charles Mayol (21 September 1863 – 16 March 1910) was a French music publisher.

The elder brother of the singer Félix Mayol, Charles-Félix-Eustache Mayol established the éditions Mayol, originally created to publish the songs of his brother and those performed by the artists of the Concert Mayol, entertainment venue Felix Mayol bought in 1909. Charles Mayol requested accession to the SACEM 18 September 1908.

The publishing company had two addresses in Paris:
 4, 10th arrondissement of Paris
 18, 10th arrondissement

Bibliography 
 Anik Devriès and François Lesure, Dictionnaire des éditeurs de musique français. Vol. II  1820 à 1914 (published with the help of the SACEM, éd. Monkoff (Geneva), 1988 1st éd. 1979)

References 

Businesspeople from Toulon
1863 births
1910 deaths
French music publishers (people)
10th arrondissement of Paris